Chýnov is a town in Tábor District in the South Bohemian Region of the Czech Republic. It has about 2,500 inhabitants.

Administrative parts
Villages of Dobronice u Chýnova, Kloužovice, Velmovice and Záhostice are administrative parts of Chýnov.

Geography
The built-up area lies in the Křemešník Highlands, but the municipal territory extends into the Tábor Uplands in the west. The highest point is the hill Ve Vrších at  aboe sea level.

History
The first written mention of Chýnov is from 981, when it was mentioned in Chronica Boemorum. From 1250, the village was owned by the bishopric in Prague. During the rule of bishop Arnošt of Pardubice, the local fortress was rebuilt into a castle, and ponds were established. In the second half of the 15th century, Chýnov was bought by the Malovec of Malovice family. In 1719, the estate eas acquired by the House of Schwarzenberg. They had rebuilt the castle into a Baroque aristocratic residence in 1729.

In 1903, Chýnov was promoted to a town.

Notable people
František Bílek (1872–1941), sculptor and architect

Twin towns – sister cities

Chýnov is twinned with:
 Oberthal, Switzerland

See also
43954 Chýnov, a minor planet named after Chýnov

References

External links

Cities and towns in the Czech Republic
Populated places in Tábor District